William Alexander Gutteron (November 26, 1899 – May 30, 1987) was a professional football player in the National Football League (NFL). He made his NFL debut in 1926 with the Los Angeles Buccaneers. He played only one season in the league.

References

1899 births
1987 deaths
American football quarterbacks
Belizean players of American football
Los Angeles Buccaneers players
Nevada Wolf Pack football players
British Honduras people